DuckTales is an American animated television series developed by Matt Youngberg and Francisco Angones for Disney Television Animation. It premiered as a sneak preview on Disney XD on August 12, 2017 and regularly on September 23, and later moved to Disney Channel on May 4, 2018. A reboot of the 1987 television series of the same name, the show centers around the continuing adventures of trillionaire and adventurer Scrooge McDuck (David Tennant), and his three troublesome, yet caring triplet nephews, Huey, Dewey, and Louie (Danny Pudi, Ben Schwartz, and Bobby Moynihan). They are accompanied by their short-tempered uncle and Scrooge's nephew Donald Duck (Tony Anselmo), their excitable friend Webby Vanderquack (Kate Micucci), her protective grandmother Mrs. Beakley (Toks Olagundoye), and accident-prone pilot Launchpad McQuack (Beck Bennett). In season two, the family is reunited with the triplets’ mother and Donald's twin sister Della Duck (Paget Brewster).

The show was renewed for a third season, which premiered on April 4, 2020. The third and final season of the series concluded on March 15, 2021.

Over the course of the series, 75 half-hours of DuckTales were produced (25 per season), comprising 64 regular episodes, 4 double-length specials, and 1 triple-length special.

Series overview

Episodes

Season 1 (2017–18)
Note: Episodes in this season are presented based on the official order of the season as stated by co-developer Francisco Angones and listed on Disney+. This may not reflect the order in which they initially aired or production number.

Season 2 (2018–19)
Note: Episodes in this season are presented based on the official order of the season as stated by co-developer Francisco Angones. This may not reflect the order in which they initially aired or production number.

Season 3 (2020–21)

Online shorts

Shorts overview

Welcome to Duckburg!
Released through the Disney XD YouTube channel ahead of the show's premiere, these shorts spotlight several characters.

30 Things
Recycling an idea used to promote the Disney Channel original movie Zombies, these shorts feature the kids listing off thirty things they like. Concurrent with the show's move from Disney XD to the Disney Channel, these and all subsequent shorts were released through the Disney Channel YouTube channel.

Webby Reacts
These shorts are "reaction videos" featuring Webby watching another Disney Channel show.

The World's Longest Deathtrap!
This five-part serial sees Webby, Dewey, Louie, Launchpad and Huey caught in an incredibly slow-moving deathtrap.

Fly
This was a cross promotional short between Disney and electronic music producer Marshmello using his song "Fly" which he had previously released on March 8, 2018. The video was simultaneously aired on Disney Channel and released through Marshmello's YouTube channel.

Dewey Dew-Night!
Episodes of Dewey's home-made "Dewey Dew-Night!" talk show, as introduced in the episode "Day of the Only Child!"

Disney Theme Song Takeover
As part of a promotional campaign, Disney Channel began airing the Disney Theme Song Takeover wherein supporting characters from different shows performed the theme song to the series they were in.

Top 4 Favorites
Huey, Dewey, Louie and Webby list off their 4 favorites of various subjects.

Disney Random Rings
Short segments that originated from Big City Greens that feature Disney Channel characters calling one another and set to Adobe Flash animation.

Chibi Tiny Tales
Disney began releasing new shorts in the Chibi Tiny Tales series, itself loosely based on the Big Chibi 6 The Shorts series.

This Duckburg Life
A podcast series that followed the series finale of DuckTales. A parody of This American Life, and to a certain extent Welcome to Night Vale, Huey Duck hosts a series where he interviews and narrates various strange happenings around Duckburg.

Ratings

 

| link2             = #Season 2 (2018–19)
| episodes2         = 24 
| start2            = 
| end2              = 
| startrating2      = 0.58
| endrating2        = 0.17
| viewers2          = |2}} 
| link3             = #Season 3 (2020–21)
| episodes3         = 22
| start3            = 
| end3              = 
| startrating3      = 0.19
| endrating3        = 0.20
| viewers3          = |2}} 
}}

Reception
 The first season of the show received generally positive acclaim. As of December 2018, it had 2.89 million views on the Disney website and holds a current rank of 89%.
 The second season also received positive acclaim like its predecessor. Episodes such as the Della Duck arc were critically acclaimed. As of October 2019, it had 3.06 million views on the Disney website and holds a rank of 90%. 
 The third season received critical acclaim. "The Last Adventure!" was its most-watched episode. As of March 2021, it had 5.12 million views and has a rank of 98%.

Notes

References

External links

Episodes
Lists of Disney Channel television series episodes
Lists of American children's animated television series episodes